The BICh-14 (aka TsKB-10) was a twin-engined tailless sport / touring aircraft designed and built in the USSR from  1934.

Development 
Full scale development emerged as the BICh-14, a 2x scaled up BICh-7A, with Townend Ring cowlings and up to five seats in the cabin. Construction was of wood with plywood and fabric skin or covering, four spars and sixty ribs.
Flight testing began late in 1934 piloted by Yu. I. Piontkovskii, and later in 1936 at the NII VVS by P.M. Stefanovskii, M.A. Nyukhtikov and I.F. Petrov. Results of the flight tests were not encouraging as the aircraft was found to have marginal control and stability, with high stick forces required to raise the nose on landing, as well as an in-effective rudder. Despite the shortcomings of the BICh-14 testing continued through to 1937.

Variants 
 BICh-10 – initial twin-engined version tested in a wind tunnel, in 1933, as a model only.
 BICh-14 – A 2x scaled up BICh-7A with two M-11 radial engines on the leading edges of the wings.

Specifications (BICh-14)

See also

References

 Gunston, Bill. “The Osprey Encyclopaedia of Russian Aircraft 1875 – 1995”. London, Osprey. 1995.

External links

 http://www.ctrl-c.liu.se/misc/RAM/bich-14.html

1930s Soviet sport aircraft
BICh-14
Aircraft first flown in 1934